Angus Glen (Census Tract No. 5350403.05) (2006 Population 2,596) is a community in the city of Markham, just north of the community and former municipality of Unionville, Ontario, Canada. The area was originally farmland, but as Unionville's housing development in the late 1990s matured in 1997 the original Angus Glen East Village, comprising approximately 500 single family homes and townhouses, was developed. Angus Glen incorporated the residential concept of "New Urbanism", to allow for the homes to be designed with the appearance of old downtown Toronto houses, with lane-ways on which the homes' separate garages were built. In the mid-2000s the land west of the small creek on the west border of the East Village commenced development, and is still under construction, known as the West Village. Throughout this period the East Village had a tract of land which had originally been sold to the school board for a possible school. However, the demographic studies could not support a school and after many years of negotiations the developer re-purchased the land in early 2014 and the East Village has had approximately 50 homes under construction, just east of the baseball park and along the north border of York Downs Golf Club. These homes will increase the East Village's homes to close to 600 and the entire community to approximately 1,100.

In addition to the Angus Glen Golf Club, the area is just west of Markham's William Berczy Historic Cemetery, which contains the graves of the early settlers of the city of Markham.

Demographics

N/A = Not Available

Other nearest communities to Angus Glen and directions
Unionville, south
Victoria Square, north-west
Cachet, west
Quartztown, south-east
Markham, east
Berczy Village, east
Cashel, north
Cathedraltown, west

Public transportation

YRT Buses
 York Region Transit Route #8: Kennedy Road (South)
 York Region Transit Route #18: Bur Oak Avenue (East-West) and effective April 17, 2015 travelling the entire East-West Angus Glen Boulevard through the community to the bus route's end at the Angus Glen Community Centre on Major Mackenzie Drive.
 York Region Transit Route #25: Major Mackenzie Drive (East-West)

Landmarks/Attractions
Angus Glen Community Centre—Arena, Sport Centre, Markham Public Library, Swimming Pool, Conference Centre
Angus Glen Golf Club - opened in 1995 on former cattle farm
York Downs Golf and Golf Club - opened in 1969 after relocating from 1922 course in Toronto

See also

 List of unincorporated communities in Ontario

References

External links

 City of Markham

Neighbourhoods in Markham, Ontario
New Urbanism communities